Robin's Donuts (commonly shortened to Robin's) is a Canadian chain of over 160 fast food restaurants that operate in every province of Canada except Quebec. In 2017 a Maclean's Magazine Poll ranked Robin's as the 7th best coffee chain out of 15 in Canada.

History
Harvey Cardwell and George Spicer opened the first store in 1975 in Thunder Bay, Ontario as "Robin's Donuts".

In October 2006, Chairman's Brand Corporation took ownership of Robin's Donuts when it purchased Afton Food Group, the former owner of Robin's Donuts, 241 Pizza and Mrs. Powell's Cinnamon Buns.

In 2015 a new logo was created which dropped "Donuts" from the name; this is likely because of the growing number of alternative new menu items.

See also

List of Canadian restaurant chains
List of coffeehouse chains
List of doughnut shops
List of fast-food chains in Canada

References

External links
 Official website

Doughnut shops
Companies based in Thunder Bay
Fast-food chains of Canada
Restaurants established in 1975
1975 establishments in Ontario
Restaurants in Ontario
Coffeehouses and cafés in Canada
Fast-food franchises
Bakery cafés